Nicholas "Nic" Fosdike (born 26 February 1980) is a former Australian rules footballer who played in the Australian Football League (AFL) for the Sydney Swans.

Career
Originally from South Australian National Football League (SANFL) club Norwood, Fosdike was chosen at number three by the Swans in the 1998 AFL Draft and made his senior AFL debut in Round Five, 1999 against the Adelaide Crows.

Fosdike was one of the best players on field during Sydney's 2005 AFL Grand Final win with 26 disposals.

He injured his knee during the 2008 pre-season and after only playing one game towards the end of the 2008 season, he announced his retirement from the AFL in January 2009.

Fosdike played 164 games between 1999 and 2009.

Statistics

|- style="background-color: #EAEAEA"
! scope="row" style="text-align:center" | 1999
|style="text-align:center;"|
| 12 || 13 || 8 || 5 || 86 || 36 || 122 || 27 || 12 || 0.6 || 0.4 || 6.6 || 2.8 || 9.4 || 2.1 || 0.9
|-
! scope="row" style="text-align:center" | 2000
|style="text-align:center;"|
| 12 || 17 || 9 || 9 || 143 || 49 || 192 || 35 || 24 || 0.5 || 0.5 || 8.4 || 2.9 || 11.3 || 2.1 || 1.4
|- style="background-color: #EAEAEA"
! scope="row" style="text-align:center" | 2001
|style="text-align:center;"|
| 12 || 17 || 4 || 9 || 121 || 53 || 174 || 35 || 31 || 0.2 || 0.5 || 7.1 || 3.1 || 10.2 || 2.1 || 1.8
|-
! scope="row" style="text-align:center" | 2002
|style="text-align:center;"|
| 12 || 21 || 14 || 7 || 251 || 110 || 361 || 66 || 54 || 0.7 || 0.3 || 12.0 || 5.2 || 17.2 || 3.1 || 2.6
|- style="background:#eaeaea;"
! scope="row" style="text-align:center" | 2003
|style="text-align:center;"|
| 12 || 24 || 9 || 9 || 267 || 113 || 380 || 57 || 74 || 0.4 || 0.4 || 11.1 || 4.7 || 15.8 || 2.4 || 3.1
|-
! scope="row" style="text-align:center" | 2004
|style="text-align:center;"|
| 12 || 13 || 3 || 4 || 126 || 85 || 211 || 33 || 39 || 0.2 || 0.3 || 9.7 || 6.5 || 16.2 || 2.5 || 3.0
|- style="background:#eaeaea;"
! scope="row" style="text-align:center" | 2005
|style="text-align:center;"|
| 12 || 11 || 6 || 1 || 107 || 62 || 169 || 36 || 31 || 0.5 || 0.1 || 9.7 || 5.6 || 15.4 || 3.3 || 2.8
|-
! scope="row" style="text-align:center" | 2006
|style="text-align:center;"|
| 12 || 24 || 7 || 2 || 266 || 103 || 369 || 91 || 82 || 0.3 || 0.1 || 11.1 || 4.3 || 15.4 || 3.8 || 3.4
|- style="background:#eaeaea;"
! scope="row" style="text-align:center" | 2007
|style="text-align:center;"|
| 12 || 23 || 6 || 3 || 277 || 128 || 405 || 89 || 89 || 0.3 || 0.1 || 12.0 || 5.6 || 17.6 || 3.9 || 3.9
|-
! scope="row" style="text-align:center" | 2008
|style="text-align:center;"|
| 12 || 1 || 0 || 1 || 11 || 4 || 15 || 1 || 3 || 0.0 || 1.0 || 11.0 || 4.0 || 15.0 || 1.0 || 3.0
|- class="sortbottom"
! colspan=3| Career
! 164
! 66
! 50
! 1655
! 743
! 2398
! 470
! 439
! 0.4
! 0.3
! 10.1
! 4.5
! 14.6
! 2.9
! 2.7
|}

References

External links

1980 births
Living people
Australian rules footballers from South Australia
Sydney Swans players
Sydney Swans Premiership players
Norwood Football Club players
Balmain Australian Football Club players
People educated at Sacred Heart College, Adelaide
One-time VFL/AFL Premiership players